The 2017–18 Danish Superliga season was the 28th season of the Danish Superliga, which decides the Danish football championship. Copenhagen are the defending champions.

Teams
Esbjerg fB finished as loser in the relegation play-offs in the 2016–17 season and was relegated to the 2017–18 1st Division along with Viborg FF who lost their relegation play-off as well.

The relegated teams were replaced by 2016–17 1st Division champions Hobro IK (returned after one year of absence) and 3rd-place finisher FC Helsingør (returned to the top division for the first time since the 1936–37 season), who defeated Viborg FF in the two legged play-off finals.

Stadia and locations

Personnel and sponsoring
Note: Flags indicate national team as has been defined under FIFA eligibility rules. Players and Managers may hold more than one non-FIFA nationality.

Managerial changes

Regular season

League table

Results

Positions by round

Championship round
Points and goals will carry over in full from the regular season.

Positions by round
Below the positions per round are shown. As teams did not all start with an equal number of points, the initial pre-playoffs positions are also given.

Relegation round
Points and goals will carry over in full from the regular season.

Group A

Group B

European play-offs
The winning team from the 4-team knock-out tournament advanced to a Europa League play-off match.

European play-off match

Relegation play-offs

Winners of matches 3, 5, and 6 would play in the 2018–19 Danish Superliga.

Second round

Silkeborg won 5–4 on aggregate. As a result Helsingør was relegated, while Silkeborg would face Esbjerg fB in round 3 to avoid relegation.

Third round

Vendsyssel won 3–1 on aggregate. As a result Lyngby was relegated, and Vendsyssel promoted.

Esbjerg won 3–1 on aggregate. As a result Silkeborg was relegated, and Esbjerg promoted.

Top goalscorers

References

External links
Superliga (uefa.com)

2017–18 in Danish football
Danish Superliga seasons
Denmark
2017–18 in Danish football leagues